2011 World Masters Athletics Championships is the nineteenth in a series of World Masters Athletics Outdoor Championships
that took place in Sacramento, United States from 6 to 17 July 2011.

The primary stadium was Hornet Stadium (Sacramento State Stadium) on the campus of Sacramento State University, which had hosted the U.S. Olympic Trials for track and field in 2000 and 2004.

Supplemental venues included Charles C. Hughes Stadium, Beaver Stadium at American River College, Granite Regional Park for Cross Country, William Land Park for Road Walks and American River Parkway for Marathon.

This Championships was organized by World Masters Athletics (WMA) in coordination with a Local Organising Committee (LOC) led by John McCasey.

The WMA is the global governing body of the sport of athletics for athletes 35 years of age or older, setting rules for masters athletics competition.

In addition to a full range of track and field events,

non-stadia events included 8K Cross Country, 10K Race Walk, 20K Race Walk, and Marathon.

Results
Official results are archived at flashresults.

Past Championships results are archived at WMA.

Additional archives are available from British Masters Athletic Federation

as searchable pdf files for women

and for men,

and from Museum of Masters Track & Field

as a searchable pdf.

Top medal winners are listed only for selected events.

100 Meters
All finals held on July 9, 2011

200 Meters
All finals held on July 12, 2011

400 Meters

800 Meters

1500 Meters

5000 Meters

10,000 Meters

80 Meters Hurdles

100 Meters Hurdles

110 Meters Hurdles

200 Meters Hurdles

300 Meters Hurdles

400 Meters Hurdles

2000 Meters Steeplechase

3000 Meters Steeplechase

5000 Meters Race Walk

10,000 Meters Race Walk

20,000 Meters Race Walk

4 x 100 Meters Relay

4 x 400 Meters Relay

8000 Meters Cross Country

Marathon

Heptathlon

Decathlon

Throws Pentathlon

Pole Vault

Hammer Throw

Weight Throw

Javelin Throw

References

External links

World Masters Athletics Championships
World Masters Athletics Championships
International track and field competitions hosted by the United States
2011
Masters athletics (track and field) records